Björn Roger Bengtsson (born 28 October 1973 in Malmö) is a Swedish actor.

Bengtsson studied at Gothenburg Theatre Academy 1993–96. He has worked at Malmö City Theatre, Helsingborg City Theatre and Riksteatern.

Bengtsson portrayed Sigefrid in BBC America and BBC Two's historical drama series The Last Kingdom.

Filmography

Film

Television

References

External links

1973 births
Swedish male actors
Living people
Actors from Malmö